Sulambek Mamilov (Russian: Суламбе́к Ахме́тович Мами́лов; 27 August 1938 – 13 January 2023) was a Soviet and Russian film director, screenwriter and actor.

Biography 
Mamilov was born on 27 August 1938 in Ordzhonikidze, present-day Vladikavkaz, Soviet Union. 

In 1957–1959 he studied at the history department of the Grozny Pedagogical Institute, then transferred to the acting department of the Russian State Institute of Performing Arts, from which he graduated in 1962. After, Mamilov was an actor of the Kh. Nuradilov Grozny Drama Theater. In 1970, he graduated from High Courses for Scriptwriters and Film Directors (studied at the workshops of Marlen Khutsiev, Aleksandr Alov and Vladimir Naumov).

Mamilov died in Moscow on 12 January 2023, at the age of 84.

Selected filmography

Actor 
 Hero of Our Time (Герой нашего времени, 1966)

Film director 
 Ladies' Tango (Дамское танго, 1983)
 Day of Wrath (День гнева, 1985)
 Children of the Storm (Ночевала тучка золотая..., 1990)
 The Murder at Zhdanovskaya (Убийство на «Ждановской», 1992)

References

External references 
 
 Биография на сайте гильдии Кинорежиссёров России.
Мамилов Суламбек Ахметович.
Интервью С.А. Мамилова порталу "Это Кавказ"

1938 births
2023 deaths
20th-century Russian screenwriters
Soviet film directors
Russian film directors
Soviet actors
High Courses for Scriptwriters and Film Directors alumni
People from Vladikavkaz